Cameron Buchanan may refer to:

Cameron Buchanan (footballer) (1928–2008), football player
Cameron Buchanan (politician) (born 1946), Scottish politician
Cameron Buchanan, discoverer of Mount Gabi